K-158 was a  Kansas highway that ran entirely through Mission, Kansas. K-158's western terminus was at U.S. Route 69 (US-69) in Mission and the eastern terminus was at K-58 in Roeland Park. It was turned back to the local authorities in 1979, and is now locally maintained Johnson Drive.

Route description
K-158 began at an intersection with US-69 in Mission, and traveled eastward on Johnson Drive. It traveled  past fast food restaurants and a few gas stations before intersecting Lamar Avenue, a city-maintained street. From here it continued east through a more residential are for another , then intersected Nall Avenue. At Nall Avenue, it turned slightly northeast and continued for another  before terminating at K-58 (modern Roe Avenue) in Roeland Park.

History
In a resolution passed on October 13, 1948, it was approved to establish K-158 as a state highway.

K-158 was created when US-50 was rerouted on to the newly built Shawnee Mission Parkway in the 1950s. It ran on Johnson Drive from US-69 (Metcalf Avenue) east to K-58/18th Street Expressway (now Roe Avenue) in Roeland Park, Kansas.

It was given to the cities to maintain in 1979 since it existed entirely within the city limits of Mission, Kansas and Roeland Park, Kansas.

Major intersections

K-258

K-258 was a short  state highway that linked K-158 to US-169 in Kansas City.

References

External links

Kansas Department of Transportation State Map
KDOT: Historic State Maps

158
U.S. Route 50